Philles Records was an American record label formed in 1961 by Phil Spector and Lester Sill, the label taking its name from a hybrid of their first names. Initially, the label was distributed by Jamie/Guyden in Philadelphia.  In 1962, Spector purchased Sill's stock to become sole owner at 21 years of age, America's youngest label chief at the time.

Founding and background
The label issued 12 albums over the course of its existence, but with the exception of A Christmas Gift for You, the focus was always on the single. However, Philles X-125 is a reissue of Philles 119, and X-125 exists with two different B-side tracks, as "Winter Wonderland" (1964) and "Winter Blues" (1965) were substituted for the original flipside, "Harry and Milt Meet Hal B" (1963). "Harry and Milt" and many other flipsides were deliberately undistinguished instrumentals, which were intended to focus attention on the A-sides. These B-sides were originally credited to the A-side artists, but later pieces were credited to the Phil Spector Group. Also, most discographies, including the one in the Back to Mono booklet, list two items with catalogue number Philles 123. "Stumble And Fall" by Darlene Love was released and then withdrawn (both stock and promos exist) in August 1964 (according to Billboard magazine). Its number was replaced with "Walking in the Rain" by The Ronettes, which came out that October. Philles 111 also has two B-sides: "My Heart Beat a Little Bit Faster" and "Playing for Keeps." The last few singles (134, 135, and 136) received much less airplay than their predecessors. Although singles 134 and 135 were "charted" by Billboard, single 136 did not—although both promo and regular stock copies exist. The promotion-only single "(Let's Dance) The Screw" by The Crystals is known only in the form of a handful of promotional copies and one stock copy.

After the chart failures of the last few singles, Phil Spector stopped producing and releasing new records on Philles. In the summer of 1966, he signed Bob Crewe and Jeff Barry to produce The Ronettes and Ike & Tina Turner. The label effectively ceased operations in 1967, and Spector did not return to production work for another two years. There was one more Philles record, The Phil Spector Spectacular. It was released only to radio stations in 1972, along with a letter from Phil. The Philles catalog is now administered by Sony Music Publishing, which acquired the catalogue when it bought EMI Music Publishing, with Sony Music's Legacy Recordings imprint handling distribution rights for the Philles catalog through a new licensing deal which was finalized in September 2009. Prior to this deal, the Philles reissues were handled by ABKCO Records.

Production 
The singles were produced by Spector, with five and one half exceptions: Philles 101, 103, and 104 were produced by Lester Sill prior to his departure from the company; Philles 133 by Jeff Barry; Philles 134 by Bob Crewe; and the B-side of Philles 136 was produced by Ike Turner. For years, The Righteous Brothers' Bill Medley has insisted that he produced "Unchained Melody" (Philles 129) but that has never been confirmed: as an album track for Just Once in My Life, Spector delegated production of such tracks to Medley. As the B-side to "Hung On You", early presses did not specify its producer on the label – Spector usually produced throwaway instrumentals on the B-side to focus on the A-side. When the track boomed in popularity, Spector eventually opted to claim credit in later presses. 

Of the non-Spector productions, only "I Can Hear Music" charted and it rose no higher than 100th place.  Every one of Spector's productions made the charts in the U.S., with the exceptions of Philles 136, one of the two Philles 123's, the withdrawn Philles 105, and the holiday single both times. Eighteen Philles records made the Top 40, the label topping the charts twice with Philles 106 in 1962, and again with Philles 124 in 1965.

Notable artists
 The Crystals
 Darlene Love
 Bob B. Soxx & the Blue Jeans
 The Ronettes
 The Righteous Brothers
 Ike & Tina Turner

Singles discography

Albums discography

Albums 4007, 4008, and 4009 were issued simultaneously in stereo with an ST- prefix. The Monarch job number for ST-4006 indicates that the stereo release of this album came in July 1966. Album 4000 was released in mono only in 1962. It was released through the Capitol Record Club in both mono and rechanneled stereo. Based on the catalog number of the record club issue, that release was in late 1966.

See also
Phi-Dan Records
Warner-Spector Records
List of record labels

Notes

References

American record labels
Record labels established in 1961
Record labels disestablished in 1967
Pop record labels
Vanity record labels
Phil Spector